Rod Williams (born 28 April 1948) is a former  Australian rules footballer who played with South Melbourne in the Victorian Football League (VFL).

Notes

External links 

Living people
1948 births
Australian rules footballers from Victoria (Australia)
Sydney Swans players